Nikola Vujnović (born 11 January 1997) is a Montenegrin professional footballer who plays as a forward for  Serbian club Voždovac.

Club career

Villareal
Vujnović joined Spanish club Villareal in the summer of 2015. He initially played in Villareal's C team in his first few seasons at the club. However, he was eventually promoted to Villareal B. He featured in Villareal B's 2018–19 Premier League International Cup campaign, scoring a penalty in a 7–0 win against Liverpool's reserves on 21 November 2018.

Podgorica
On 30 July 2019, Vujnović signed a one-year contract with Montenegrin club Podgorica. He scored a total of seven goals over the course of the 2019–20 season.

Voždovac
On 29 July 2020, Vujnović joined Voždovac.

Sporting Kansas City
On 15 February 2022, Vujnović signed with Sporting Kansas City on a season long loan with a purchase option. On 8 July 2022, Vujnović and Kansas City agreed to terminate his loan at the club.

International career
He made his national team debut on 7 October 2020 in a friendly against Latvia.

Career

International

. Montenegro score listed first, score column indicates score after each of his goal.

References

External links

 
 Nikola Vujnović stats at utakmica.rs
 Nikola Vujnović Twitter
 Nikola Vujnović Instagram

1997 births
Living people
Sportspeople from Cetinje
Association football forwards
Montenegrin footballers
Montenegro youth international footballers
Montenegro under-21 international footballers
Montenegro international footballers
FK Radnički Obrenovac players
FK Rad players
Villarreal CF C players
Villarreal CF B players
FK Podgorica players
FK Voždovac players
Sporting Kansas City players
Serbian SuperLiga players
Tercera División players
Montenegrin First League players
Montenegrin expatriate footballers
Expatriate footballers in Serbia
Montenegrin expatriate sportspeople in Serbia
Expatriate footballers in Spain
Montenegrin expatriate sportspeople in Spain
Major League Soccer players